Howz-e Sorkh (also Romanized as Ḩowẕ-e Sorkh) is a village in Pas Kalut Rural District, in the Central District of Gonabad County, Razavi Khorasan Province, Iran. At the 2006 census, its population was 4, in 4 families.

References 

Populated places in Gonabad County